The 1968 Northern 300 was a NASCAR Grand National Series event that was held on July 14, 1968, at Trenton Speedway in Trenton, New Jersey.

Background
The first race at the Fairgrounds was held on September 24, 1900, but there was no further racing there until 1907. Regular racing began in 1912 and continued until 1941. A new 1 mile dirt oval was opened in 1946. In 1957 the track was paved. It operated in that configuration until 1968 when the track was expanded to 1.5 miles (2.41 km) and a "kidney bean" shape with a 20° right-hand dogleg on the back stretch and a wider turn 3 & 4 complex than turns 1 & 2. The track closed in 1980 and the Fairgrounds itself closed 3 years later. The former site of the speedway is now occupied by the Grounds for Sculpture, a UPS shipping facility, and the housing development known as "Hamilton Lakes".

Race report
Three hundred laps were done on a paved oval track spanning . The total time of the race was three hours and twenty-two minutes; LeeRoy Yarbrough defeated David Pearson by more than one lap in front of 16800 people. Five cautions were waved for twenty-eight laps. Retired Canadian driver Frog Fagan participated in this race. Total winnings for this race were $17,725 USD ($ when considering inflation).

Bobby Allison was driving a 1966 Chevrolet Chevelle to this event. While he flourished early on as an independent race car driver, he quickly floundered after being able to compete against NASCAR racing legends like LeeRoy Yarbrough and David Pearson on a consistent basis.

Gene Black, Blaine Kauffman, and David Mote would end their top-level professional stock car careers at this event. Notable crew chiefs on attendance for this race include Junior Johnson, Harry Hyde, Dale Inman and Jake Elder.

The transition to purpose-built racecars began in the early 1960s and occurred gradually over that decade.  Changes made to the sport by the late 1960s brought an end to the "strictly stock" vehicles of the 1950s.

Qualifying

Finishing order

 LeeRoy Yarbrough† (#98)
 David Pearson† (#17)
 Bobby Allison (#2)
 Charlie Glotzbach (#6)
 Pete Hamilton† (#5)
 James Hylton† (#48)
 John Sears† (#4)
 G.C. Spencer† (#49)
 Elmo Langley† (#64)
 Clyde Lynn† (#20)
 Jabe Thomas (#25)
 Wendell Scott† (#34)
 Dick Johnson (#18)
 Bill Seifert (#45)
 Bill Champion*† (#10)
 Bobby Isaac*† (#71)
 Blaine Kauffmann* (#44)
 Darel Dieringer*† (#22)
 J.D. McDuffie*† (#70)
 Buddy Baker*† (#3)
 Buck Baker*† (#87)
 Richard Petty* (#43)
 Earl Brooks*† (#28)
 Paul Dean Holt* (#01)
 Stan Meserve* (#51)
 Neil Castles* (#06)
 Don Tarr* (#0)
 Roy Hallquist* (#11)
 Sonny Hutchins*† (#90)
 Roy Tyner*† (#76)
 Gene Black*† (#75)
 Ed Negre*† (#8)
 Frog Fagan* (#23)
 David Mote* (#69)
 Bill Vanderhoff* (#09)
 George Davis* (#07)

† signifies that the driver is known to be deceased 
* Driver failed to finish race

Timeline
Section reference: 
 Start of race: LeeRoy Yarbrough began the event with the pole position.
 Lap 2: David Pearson took over the lead from LeeRoy Yarbrough.
 Lap 3: LeeRoy Yarbrough took over the lead from David Pearson.
 Lap 18: Roy Tyner blew his vehicle's engine while racing at high speeds.
 Lap 39: Bobby Isaac took over the lead from LeeRoy Yarbrough.
 Lap 40: Richard Petty took over the lead from Bobby Isaac.
 Lap 41: LeeRoy Yarbrough took over the lead from Richard Petty.
 Lap 74: Don Tarr had a terminal crash, forcing him to retire from the event prematurely.
 Lap 96: Richard Petty took over the lead from LeeRoy Yarbrough.
 Lap 97: LeeRoy Yarbrough took over the lead from Richard Petty.
 Lap 111: Stan Meserve managed to lose the rear end of his vehicle.
 Lap 119: Earl Brooks had a terminal crash, forcing him to retire from the event early.
 Lap 134: Richard Petty took over the lead from LeeRoy Yarbrough.
 Lap 135: Bobby Isaac took over the lead from Richard Petty.
 Lap 136: Richard Petty took over the lead from Bobby Isaac.
 Lap 145: LeeRoy Yarbrough took over the lead from Richard Petty.
 Lap 162: Richard Petty blew his vehicle's engine while racing at high speeds.
 Lap 168: Buck Baker blew his vehicle's engine while racing at high speeds.
 Lap 191: Buddy Baker blew his vehicle's engine while racing at high speeds.
 Lap 231: Darel Dieringer blew his vehicle's engine while racing at high speeds.
 Lap 249: Blaine Kauffmann notice that the oil in his vehicle was leaking badly, forcing him to exit the race with a somewhat respectable 17th-place finish.
 Lap 250: Bobby Isaac blew his vehicle's engine while racing at high speeds.
 Lap 254: Bill Champion blew his vehicle's engine while racing at high speeds.
 Finish: LeeRoy Yarbrough was officially declared the winner of the event.

References

Northern 300
Northern 300
NASCAR races at Trenton Speedway